Yang Yongxin (born 21 June 1962) is a highly controversial Chinese clinical psychiatrist who advocated and practiced electroconvulsive therapy (ECT) without anaesthesia or muscle relaxants as a cure for alleged video game and Internet addiction in adolescents. Yang is currently deputy chief of the Fourth Hospital of Linyi (Linyi Mental Hospital), in the Shandong province of China. He runs the Internet Addiction Treatment Center at the hospital.

According to media reports, families of teenaged patients sent to the hospital paid CNY 5,500 (US$805) per month to be treated using a combination of psychiatric medication and ECT, which Yang dubbed as "xingnao" (brain-waking) treatment. He treated 3000 children before the practice was prohibited by the Chinese Ministry of Health. Yang claimed that 96% of his patients had shown signs of improvement, a figure that was questioned by the Chinese media. Since the ban, Yang has used  'low-frequency pulse therapy', a treatment of his own devising alleged by former patients to be more painful than ECT. In 2016, the center claimed to have treated more than 6000 adolescents.

Early life
Yang was born in June 1962 in the Chinese city of Linyi, Shandong province. He graduated from Yishui Medical School, a vocational school in Yishui, Shandong, with a degree in Clinical Medicine in 1982. Yang was assigned by the state to the Fourth Hospital of Linyi (also known as Linyi Mental Hospital), where he specialized in treating schizophrenia, depression, anxiety disorder, and obsessive-compulsive disorder. He wrote a series of columns on popular psychology for the local newspaper during his tenure at Linyi Mental Hospital, although his critics alleged the columns were paid advertisements for the hospital. On 29 September 1997, Yang received the  honor of becoming a Top 10 Underage Protector in Shandong for his work treating Internet addiction disorder in teenagers.

Internet addiction treatment
According to Yang, he began to investigate Internet addiction in 1999 when his teenage son began to spend more and more time playing video games every day. Yang established an "Internet-addiction camp" inside the Fourth Hospital in 2006 and began practicing ECT. Yang was awarded the Top Ten Outstanding Citizens for Protecting the Minors of Shandong by the Shandong provincial government for the therapy in 2007. In 2008, Yang became the director of the Internet Addiction Treatment Center.

Yang caused widespread controversy in China when its most viewed television channel, the state-run China Central Television (CCTV), aired a special about Yang's treatment center in July 2008. The program, titled Fighting the Internet Demon: Who Turned Our Geniuses into Beasts, reported positively on Yang's ECT therapy and sharply criticized the massively multiplayer online role-playing game (MMORPG) World of Warcraft, then popular in China and blamed for many teenagers' purported Internet addiction. The program initially caused an uproar in China's World of Warcraft community, a sentiment that later spread to most of China's Internet community. Yang's critics revealed some of his most controversial practices, which led to the mainstream media abandoning their praise of his treatment center. Nevertheless, Yang went on to win a State Council grant for excellence in medical science in February 2009.

In May 2009, China Youth Daily, a leading state-run newspaper in China, published a highly negative investigative report on Yang's practices, which received coverage on both the CCTV and other prominent Chinese media, eventually leading to coverage in Science. CCTV-12, in particular, aired a segment featuring a young adult who was drugged by his parents, brought to Yang's clinic and received an hour of ECT. The controversy eventually led to the Chinese Ministry of Health issuing a ban on Yang's use of electroconvulsive therapy. In August, CCTV aired its own investigative report, further questioning the ethics of Yang's treatment center. The report alleged that Yang had received CNY 81 million (US$12.73 million) from his treatment center. As of publishing of the report, more than 3,000 adolescents had experienced the therapy.

Treatment program
In the controversial July 2008 CCTV coverage of Yang's treatment center, he claimed that patients with alleged Internet addiction suffered from "cognitive and personality disorders".
Yang promoted electroconvulsive therapy as a means to remedy such disorders.
According to an investigative report, Yang's patients ranged from 12 to 30 years of age. Most of them were abducted by their parents or the "Special Operations", an informal branch of the treatment center that consisted of parents and more senior patients, who were rewarded for their participation in abducting new patients. The parents (even those of adult patients) would then sign a contract with the treatment center placing the patients into foster care by the treatment center. After they were admitted, Yang's patients were allegedly placed into a prison-like environment, where they were forced to reveal all of their online accounts and passwords. Reports also show Yang managing his patients in a military manner, encouraging patients to act as his informants and threatening resisting patients with ECT, which former patients claimed he used solely as a means of torturing them.

In addition to electroconvulsive therapy, Yang used psychotropic drugs, including diazepam, paroxetine, and buspirone, without the consent of patients or their parents, claiming that the drugs were "dietary supplements". The center also had mandatory sessions with psychiatric counselors, where patients were taught obedience to Yang, whom they were forced to call "Uncle Yang". Yang also warned patients against asking their parents to take them home, another offense punishable by ECT.

After his use of electroconvulsive therapy was banned, Yang continues to practice using another therapeutic method he invented, known as "low-frequency pulse therapy", which is alleged by former patients to be more painful than ECT therapy.

Controversies

Unethical treatment controversy
Electroconvulsive therapy at Yang's treatment center was performed in "Room 13" (later renamed the "Behavioral Correction Therapy Room" after media scrutiny). Yang claimed that ECT therapy "is only painful for those with Internet addiction" and that the therapeutic machines used "lowered electric current".
Investigative reports questioned whether Yang's use of ECT without anesthesia or muscle relaxants on minors, whose informed consent was not obtained, was in violation of the WHO guidelines on electroconvulsive therapy. Reports further accuse Yang of using the therapy as a means of torture. Although ECT had been regulated in some areas in China, Shandong province did not have regulations regarding the therapy.

In response, Yang's supporters claimed that ECT was not the primary form of treatment and that psychiatric counseling was emphasized at the center. Yang stated that admitted patients were shocked only a few times during their treatment. Yang maintained that he was properly licensed in performing ECT, and that his treatment program was fully compliant with Chinese laws and regulations regarding clinical psychology.

Reports also state that Yang applied electric shock to patients' hands, a non-indicated usage that is said to produce more pain, as a punitive measure.

Safety of therapy
In 2009, China Youth Daily publicized the news of a patient who escaped from Yang's treatment center. He jumped from a second-floor window at the treatment center. The report alleged that Yang's ECT therapy triggered cardiac arrhythmia in the escaped patient, questioning the safety of Yang's therapy.

Legality of therapy
Some commentators called Yang's practice a violation of patients' basic human rights. Critics contend that Yang's abduction of his patients and use of electroconvulsive therapy may have violated Chinese laws on the protection of minors and may have constituted aggravated assault. Critics maintain that Yang's failure to obtain informed consent may also be in violation of the International Covenant of Civil and Political Rights, which China has signed but not ratified.

The machine Yang used for ECT treatments is a DX-IIA ECT device, manufactured by a Shanghai pharmaceutical company from 1996 to 2000. The manufacturer warned of impaired cognition as a side effect. Chinese health regulation had stopped the device from being manufactured since 2000, and reports brought into question whether Yang acquired these devices illegally.

Clinical trial controversy
In 2006, Yang claimed to have invented a formula of Chinese traditional medicine that is effective in treating Internet addiction. Yang applied for a patent for his formula, although the Chinese State Intellectual Property Office has not responded to his application. Yang's patent application claims that he had conducted a clinical trial with 300 patients at his treatment center, and that all 300 patients were "completely cured of their addiction by the medication". The patients' informed consent was not sought, and minors as young as 14 years of age were involved in the clinical trial.

Diagnostic standard
Critics have raised questions about Yang diagnostic standard, claiming that he would admit anyone brought to his treatment center. Yang's published "diagnostic test" is criticized as remarkably lax, as almost any choices on the test will be diagnosed as Internet addiction. In July 2009, celebrity Chinese scholar and anti-pseudoscience crusader Fang Zhouzi published an essay that criticized the notion of Internet addiction and questioned the ethics of electroconvulsive therapy without anesthesia.

Government ban
In July 2009, the Chinese Ministry of Health issued an official ban on the use of electroconvulsive therapy in treating Internet addiction, citing a lack of evidence as to its effectiveness. However, Yang's treatment center continued to operate after the ban by providing "low-frequency-pulse electronic acupuncture" instead of ECT; critics protested that Yang's new therapeutic methods were designed to torture patients and called for an end to Yang's practice altogether.

The controversy reheats
In August 2016, a blog article "Yang Yongxin, a devil still at large" was posted on WeChat and Sina Weibo, and later made its way into Tencent News. By providing a description of Yang, his therapy, and the government ban, the article re-ignited controversies around Yang, leading to an interview of former patients by China Youth Daily. Justice Online, a news site run by the Supreme People's Procuratorate, also reported on deaths and injuries caused by shocks in Yang-style treatments. However, Linyi's local health commission considers Yang's method legitimate; in addition, Yang claimed "governmental support" for his center.

In October 2016, a proposed draft of Regulation on the Online Protection of Minors which refers to terms on controlling Internet addiction was released for public commenting. In response, Justice Online called for a clear definition of "Internet addiction" as well as respect for minors' rights.

In October 2018, a video showing a patient crying after being treated at the Fourth Hospital of Linyi was posted on Sina Weibo. Public concern about Yang's treatment center's existence reheated. Linyi's local health commission later responded that the individual was "an eight-year-old autism patient" and noted that the Yang's treatment center has been closed since August 2016. The video was later deleted by the publisher under order of police; the publisher publicly apologized for "leading an bad influence to the Fourth Hospital of Linyi". According to The Paper, a Chinese news report website, the hospital has removed words describing the center such as "网戒中心" (internet rehab center). The source also noted the hospital's introduction to Yang said he is good at "curing Internet Addiction and personality abnormality, preventing adolescence's dangerous behavior, fixing family problems", despite the controversies.

Dead by Daylight
In 2017, the survival horror video game Dead by Daylight added a new downloadable content pack called "Spark of Madness". It featured a new map (Lery's Memorial Institute) based on Yang's hospital, a new killer named Herman Carter a.k.a “The Doctor” who is a doctor with the power to shock survivors, manipulating them mentally, and a new survivor (Feng Min) who is a former e-sports player. It is believed that this character is based on Yang as an earlier character selection poll chose him to be the next character.

Publications 
 "Altered Structural Correlates of Impulsivity in Adolescents with Internet Gaming Disorder". Du X, Qi X, Yang Y, Du G, Gao P, Zhang Y, Qin W, Li X, Zhang Q.Front Hum Neurosci. 2016 Jan 28;10:4. doi: 10.3389/fnhum.2016.00004. eCollection 2016.
 "Effects of outcome on the covariance between risk level and brain activity in adolescents with internet gaming disorder". Qi X, Yang Y, Dai S, Gao P, Du X, Zhang Y, Du G, Li X, Zhang Q.Neuroimage Clin. 2016 Nov 2;12:845-851. eCollection 2016.
 "Diffusion tensor imaging of the structural integrity of white matter correlates with impulsivity in adolescents with internet gaming disorder". Du X, Liu L, Yang Y, Qi X, Gao P, Zhang Y, Zhu J, Du G, Dai S, Li X, Zhang Q.Brain Behav. 2017 Jun 21;7(8):e00753. doi: 10.1002/brb3.753. eCollection 2017 Aug.
 "Decreased modulation by the risk level on the brain activation during decision making in adolescents with internet gaming disorder". Qi X, Du X, Yang Y, Du G, Gao P, Zhang Y, Qin W, Li X, Zhang Q.Front Behav Neurosci. 2015 Nov 3;9:296. doi: 10.3389/fnbeh.2015.00296. eCollection 2015.
 "Higher integrity of the motor and visual pathways in long-term video game players". Zhang Y, Du G, Yang Y, Qin W, Li X, Zhang Q.Front Hum Neurosci. 2015 Mar 10;9:98. doi: 10.3389/fnhum.2015.00098. eCollection 2015.
 "Brain Structures Associated with Internet Addiction Tendency in Adolescent Online Game Players". Pan N, Yang Y, Du X, Qi X, Du G, Zhang Y, Li X, Zhang Q.Front Psychiatry. 2018 Mar 6;9:67. doi: 10.3389/fpsyt.2018.00067. eCollection 2018.
 "Compensatory increase of functional connectivity density in adolescents with internet gaming disorder". Du X, Yang Y, Gao P, Qi X, Du G, Zhang Y, Li X, Zhang Q.Brain Imaging Behav. 2017 Dec;11(6):1901-1909. doi: 10.1007/s11682-016-9655-x.

See also
Involuntary commitment
Judge Rotenberg Educational Center
War of Internet Addiction
 Electroshock treatment for internet addition – article detailing Yang's practice on Chinese Wikipedia

References

External links 
addiction shock therapy banned. Reported by Jane Chen  |   2009-7-15 
Net addicts need help from school and home
Cure your Children's Internet Addiction with Electric Shocks Aversion Therapy May 14th, 2009 
therapy for Internet addiction halted. Posted by Eric Mu, July 14
China's parents try shock tactics to cure net ‘addicts’
Case study: Electric shock therapy in China for internet 'addiction'
China bans electric shock therapy for internet addicts
The Fourth Hospital of Linyi

Living people
Chinese psychiatrists
1962 births
People from Linyi
20th-century Chinese physicians
21st-century Chinese physicians
Psychiatry controversies
Physicians from Shandong